Jacques Planchard (May 1929 – 28 June 2013) was a Belgian politician, born in Virton. He was the Governor of Luxembourg (1976–1996).

References

1929 births
2013 deaths
Governors of Luxembourg (Belgium)